The 2015 Waterford Crystal Cup was the tenth and final staging of the Waterford Crystal Cup. It was replaced by the Munster Senior Hurling League in 2016.

The Waterford Crystal Cup is a hurling competition organised by the Munster Council of the Gaelic Athletic Association for the inter-county teams and third-level institutes and universities in the province of Munster in Ireland.

The competition began on 10 January 2015 and ended on 31 January 2014.
Tipperary were the defending champions.

Limerick won their second Waterford Crystal Cup after a 3-20 to 1-16 win against Cork in the final in Mallow.

Teams
A total of eleven teams contested the 2015 Waterford Crystal Cup.

The following third level colleges took part.
 University College Cork (UCC)
 Limerick Institute of Technology (LIT)
 University of Limerick (UL)
 Cork Institute of Technology (CIT)
 Mary Immaculate College (Mary I)

The following county teams took part.
Cork
Clare
Kerry
Tipperary
Limerick
Waterford

Fixtures

Preliminary round

Quarter-finals

Semi-finals

Final

References

External links
Waterford Crystal Cup at Munster GAA

Waterford
Waterford Crystal Cup